Altuda is an unincorporated community in northern Brewster County, Texas United States.

References

Unincorporated communities in Brewster County, Texas
Unincorporated communities in Texas